The iron cycle (Fe) is the biogeochemical cycle of iron through the atmosphere, hydrosphere, biosphere and lithosphere. While Fe is highly abundant in the Earth's crust, it is less common in oxygenated surface waters. Iron is a key micronutrient in primary productivity, and a limiting nutrient in the Southern ocean, eastern equatorial Pacific, and the subarctic Pacific referred to as High-Nutrient, Low-Chlorophyll (HNLC) regions of the ocean.

Iron exists in a range of oxidation states from -2 to +7; however, on Earth it is predominantly in its +2 or +3 redox state and is a primary redox-active metal on Earth. The cycling of iron between its +2 and +3 oxidation states is referred to as the iron cycle. This process can be entirely abiotic or facilitated by microorganisms, especially iron-oxidizing bacteria. The abiotic processes include the rusting of iron-bearing metals, where Fe2+ is abiotically oxidized to Fe3+  in the presence of oxygen, and the reduction of Fe3+ to Fe2+ by iron-sulfide minerals. The biological cycling of Fe2+ is done by iron oxidizing and reducing microbes.

Iron is an essential micronutrient for almost every life form. It is a key component of hemoglobin, important to nitrogen fixation as part of the Nitrogenase enzyme family, and as part of the iron-sulfur core of ferredoxin it facilitates electron transport in chloroplasts, eukaryotic mitochondria, and bacteria. Due to the high reactivity of Fe2+ with oxygen and low solubility of Fe3+, iron is a limiting nutrient in most regions of the world.

Ancient earth 

On the early Earth, when atmospheric oxygen levels were 0.001% of those present today, dissolved Fe2+ was thought to have been a lot more abundant in the oceans, and thus more bioavailable to microbial life. Iron sulfide may have provided the energy and surfaces for the first organisms. At this time, before the onset of oxygenic photosynthesis, primary production may have been dominated by photo-ferrotrophs, which would obtain energy from sunlight, and use the electrons from Fe2+ to fix carbon.

During the Great Oxidation Event, 2.3-2.5 billion years ago, dissolved iron was oxidized by oxygen produced by cyanobacteria to form iron oxides. The iron oxides were denser than water and fell to the ocean floor forming banded iron formations (BIF). Over time, rising oxygen levels removed increasing amounts of iron from the ocean. BIFs have been a key source of iron ore in modern times.

Terrestrial ecosystems  
The iron cycle is an important component of the terrestrial ecosystems. The ferrous form of iron, Fe2+, is dominant in the Earth's mantle, core, or deep crust. The ferric form, Fe3+, is more stable in the presence of oxygen gas. Dust is a key component in the Earth's iron cycle. Chemical and biological weathering break down iron-bearing minerals, releasing the nutrient into the atmosphere. Changes in hydrological cycle and vegetative cover impact these patterns and have a large impact on global dust production, with dust deposition estimates ranging between 1000 and 2000 Tg/year. Aeolian dust is a critical part of the iron cycle by transporting iron particulates from the Earth's land via the atmosphere to the ocean.

Volcanic eruptions are also a key contributor to the terrestrial iron cycle, releasing iron-rich dust into the atmosphere in either a large burst or in smaller spurts over time. The atmospheric transport of iron-rich dust can impact the ocean concentrations.

Oceanic ecosystem 
The ocean is a critical component of the Earth's climate system, and the iron cycle plays a key role in ocean primary productivity and marine ecosystem function. Iron limitation has been known to limit the efficiency of the biological carbon pump. The largest supply of iron to the oceans is from rivers, where it is suspended as sediment particles. Coastal waters receive inputs of iron from rivers and anoxic sediments. Other major sources of iron to the ocean include glacial particulates, atmospheric dust transport, and hydrothermal vents. Iron supply is an important factor affecting growth of phytoplankton, the base of marine food web. Offshore regions rely on atmospheric dust deposition and upwelling. Other major sources of iron to the ocean include glacial particulates, hydrothermal vents, and volcanic ash. In offshore regions, bacteria also compete with phytoplankton for uptake of iron. In HNLC regions, iron limits the productivity of phytoplankton.

Most commonly, iron was available as an inorganic source to phytoplankton; however, organic forms of iron can also be used by specific diatoms which use a process of surface reductase mechanism.  Uptake of iron by phytoplankton leads to lowest iron concentrations in surface seawater. Remineralization occurs when the sinking phytoplankton are degraded by zooplankton and bacteria. Upwelling recycles iron and causes higher deep water iron concentrations. On average there is 0.07±0.04 nmol Fe kg−1 at the surface (<200 m) and 0.76±0.25 nmol Fe kg−1 at depth (>500 m).  Therefore, upwelling zones contain more iron than other areas of the surface oceans. Soluble iron in ferrous form is bioavailable for utilization which commonly comes from aeolian resources.  

Iron primarily is present in particulate phases as ferric iron, and the dissolved iron fraction is removed out of the water column by coagulation. For this reason, the dissolved iron pool turns over rapidly, in around 100 years.

Interactions with other elemental cycles 

The iron cycle interacts significantly with the sulfur, nitrogen, and phosphorus cycles. Soluble Fe(II) can act as the electron donor, reducing oxidized organic and inorganic electron receptors, including O2 and NO3, and become oxidized to Fe(III). The oxidized form of iron can then be the electron acceptor for reduced sulfur, H2, and organic carbon compounds. This returns the iron to the oxidized Fe(II) state, completing the cycle.

The transition of iron between Fe(II) and Fe(III) in aquatic systems interacts with the freshwater phosphorus cycle. With oxygen in the water, Fe(II) gets oxidized to Fe(III), either abiotically or by microbes via lithotrophic oxidation. Fe(III) can form iron hydroxides, which bind tightly to phosphorus, removing it from the bioavailable phosphorus pool, limiting primary productivity. In anoxic conditions, Fe(III) can be reduced, used by microbes to be the final electron acceptor from either organic carbon or H2. This releases the phosphorus back into the water for biological use.

The iron and sulfur cycle can interact at several points. Purple sulfur bacteria and green sulfur bacteria can use Fe(II) as an electron donor during anoxic photosynthesis. Sulfate reducing bacteria in anoxic environments can reduce sulfate to sulfide, which then binds to Fe(II) to create iron sulfide, a solid mineral that precipitates out of water and removes the iron and sulfur. The iron, phosphate, and sulfur cycles can all interact with each other. Sulfide can reduce Fe(III) from iron that is already bound to phosphate when there are no more metal ions available, which releases the phosphate and creates iron sulfide.

Iron plays an important role in the nitrogen cycle, aside from its role as part of the enzymes involved in nitrogen fixation. In anoxic conditions, Fe(II) can donate an electron that is accepted by N03− which is oxidized to several different forms of nitrogen compounds, NO2−, N20, N2, and NH4+, while Fe(II) is reduced to Fe(III).

Anthropogenic influences  
Human impact on the iron cycle in the ocean is due to dust concentrations increasing at the beginning of the industrial era. Today, there is approximately double the amount of soluble iron in oceans than pre-industrial times from anthropogenic pollutants and soluble iron combustion sources. Changes in human land-use activities and climate have augmented dust fluxes which increases the amount of aeolian dust to open regions of the ocean. Other anthropogenic sources of iron are due to combustion. Highest combustion rates of iron occurs in East Asia, which contributes to 20-100% of ocean depositions around the globe.

Humans have altered the cycle for Nitrogen from fossil fuel combustion and large-scale agriculture. Due to increased Iron and Nitrogen raises marine nitrogen fixation in the subtropical North and South Pacific Ocean. In the subtropics, tropics and HNLC regions, increased inputs of iron may lead to increased CO2 uptake, impacting the global carbon cycle.

See also 
 Iron fertilization
 Iron-oxidizing bacteria

References

Further reading 

 

Biogeochemical cycle
Geological processes
Iron